The Blackburn Cirrus Major is a British, inline-four aircraft engine that was developed in the late 1930s.

Design and development
The Blackburn Cirrus Major started life as a continued evolution of the original Cirrus and Hermes series of aircraft engines which had been in production for the last decade. C. S. Napier, son of engine designer Montague Napier, was Technical Director and Chief Designer for Cirrus-Hermes Engineering when he began work on two new engines, the Cirrus minor and the larger Cirrus Major. The engines were still under development when the company was bought by the Blackburn Aeroplane & Motor Company, moved to a new factory at Brough in Yorkshire and renamed Cirrus Hermes Engineering.

Like all the Cirrus engines, the Major was an air-cooled inverted four-cylinder inline design. Aimed at the same market for a robust, reliable and affordable light aircraft engine, it retained many proven design features of the originals while making many improvements. Cylinder barrels were of forged steel while the individual heads were of light alloy. Unlike the Minor, the Major retained the established long bolts which passed through the barrels to secure the heads to the crank case, as well as the general layout of the heads from the Hermes IV A, which remained in production alongside. Pistons and con-rods were of light alloys, with a steel crankshaft. Direct drive to the propeller, without reduction gearing, helped to keep engine revs low and reliability high. The single carburettor was a Claudel Hobson AV.48D.

In 1935 the Cirrus Minor entered production and the Major followed soon afterwards. Two years later, with its product range now rationalised and the new engines settled in the marketplace, the company was brought into its parent as the Cirrus Engines Division of Blackburn Aircraft.

Variants

Cirrus Major I
135 hp
Cirrus Major II
148 hp variant.
Cirrus Major III
Higher compression engine with an increase in output to 150 hp (116kW).

Applications

Specifications (Cirrus Major I)

See also

ADC Cirrus

References

Notes

Bibliography

Oldengine.org
 
 Lumsden, Alec. British Piston Engines and their Aircraft. Marlborough, Wiltshire: Airlife Publishing, 2003. .

Air-cooled aircraft piston engines
Blackburn aircraft engines
1930s aircraft piston engines
Inverted aircraft piston engines